From the Wilderness and Lebanon - An Israeli soldier's story of war and recovery is the English translation of the first book by Israeli author Asael Lubotzky.

The book records his experiences when serving as an officer in the Israeli army during the 2006 Lebanon War and recounts autobiographically his long period of recovery from the wounds he sustained in battle. The book was originally published in Hebrew by Yedioth Books in 2008, and became a bestseller, and in English translation under this title in 2016. The army's former chief of staff, General Moshe Ya'alon, wrote a laudatory foreword.

Synopsis
The book describes the Second Lebanon War from the perspective of a platoon commander in the Golani Brigade. It records the preparations for battle, the fighting itself, and the responsibilities and challenges that faced him as he led his men forward under fire.

The first section records how the kidnapping of Gilad Shalit compelled Israel to respond and fight in Gaza. Battalion 51, part of the Golani Brigade, entered Gaza. From fighting there the soldiers were called to fight in the north, in what came to be called the Second Lebanon War and forms the subject of the second section. Among the many engagements, the most memorable was the Battle of Bint Jbeil in which Roi Klein, the deputy-battalion-commander was killed together with seven officers and men. Among the fallen was Amichai, the author's closest friend, and Asael describes the terrible experience of finding himself holding the dead body of his dearest comrade. It is to the latter's memory that the book is dedicated. After many days' fighting at Bint Jbeil, the author himself was severely wounded when an anti-tank missile hit his vehicle.

Then comes the period of his personal struggle, the mental strength he needed in order to undergo numerous operations, lengthy hospitalization, and a protracted period of rehabilitation during which he learned to walk again.

In addition to those personal experiences, there emerge certain stories connected with the past, such as the discovery that the nurse who tended his grandfather, Iser Lubotzky, when injured as a partisan fighting against the Nazis was the mother of the doctor who was treating Asael. As a result of his experiences during his hospitalization, Asael determined that he too would study medicine and, despite the fact that he walks on crutches, Lubotzky has since then become a qualified pediatrician working at the Shaare Zedek Hospital in Jerusalem.

Title of the book
The title of the book has a double meaning, referring both to the location of the Second Lebanon War but also to the biblical verse Deuteronomy 11:24: "Every place whereon the soles of your feet shall tread shall be yours: from the wilderness and Lebanon, from the river, the river Euphrates, even unto the uttermost sea shall your coast be", defining the boundaries of the Promised Land. There is the further implication that the Desert and Lebanon represent different emotional situations - the first symbolizing the difficult period of his rehabilitation, and the second representing the resilience it demanded.

Reception
The book became a bestseller and received wide coverage, perhaps because it recorded acts of heroism in a war that was perceived by many as a failure. Former IDF chief of staff and former Israeli Defense Minister, Lt. General Moshe (Bogie) Ya'alon, wrote in the Foreword:

Many reviews of the book saw it as representing 'the beautiful Israel', the embodiment of modern Zionism, while others felt that it should have criticized more forcefully the political and military leadership of the war.

The English translation of the book was launched on October 20, 2016, in Jerusalem at an evening event entitled "Faith and Doubt in Times of Uncertainty". The speakers were Rabbi Shlomo Riskin, Brigadier-general Avigdor Kahalani, and the author, Asael Lubotzky. Today the book serves as a text in the IDF's officers' course.

External links
 From the Wilderness and Lebanon, Official site

References

Books about Israel
2006 Lebanon War
Israeli–Lebanese conflict
Israeli–Palestinian conflict books
2008 non-fiction books
Military autobiographies